Chandrasekharan Kesavadas is an Indian radiologist and a professor of radiology at the Sree Chitra Tirunal Institute for Medical Sciences and Technology. His research focus in the fields of magnetic resonance imaging, neuroradiology medical imaging informatics and brain Computer interface. He led a team of scientists who developed an imaging protocol for scanning intractable epilepsy, a computational software for detecting cortical dysplasia and novel neuroimaging systems for weighted imaging of brain cancer. His studies have been documented by way of a number of articles and ResearchGate, an online repository of scientific articles has listed 275 of them. The Department of Biotechnology of the Government of India awarded him the National Bioscience Award for Career Development, one of the highest Indian science awards, for his contributions to biosciences, in 2009. The award orations delivered by him include the 2010 edition of the M. N. Sen Oration of the Indian Council of Medical Research.

Selected bibliography

Notes

References

External links 
 
 

N-BIOS Prize recipients
Indian scientific authors
Living people
Medical doctors from Thiruvananthapuram
Indian radiologists
University of Calicut alumni
Year of birth missing (living people)
Indian medical researchers